Juan Diego del Castillo (1744–1793) was a Spanish pharmacist and botanist who joined Vicente Cervantes in Mexico.  Castillo wrote Plantas descritas en el viaje de Acapulco.  He died in Mexico.  Castillo had been a contemporary of Martín Sessé y Lacasta.  In New Spain, Lacasta had been joined by a group of Spanish botanists selected by Casimiro Gómez Ortega, director of the Royal Botanical Garden of Madrid. These included Cervantes, José Longinos Martínez, and Del Castillo.

Del Castillo left a large sum of money towards the printing of their projected book Flora Mexicana.  Cervantes named the genus Castilla after him.

Notes

1744 births
1793 deaths
18th-century Spanish botanists